Sardasht Rural District is in Rudasht District of Lordegan County, Chaharmahal and Bakhtiari province, Iran. At the census of 2006, its population was 13,006 in 2,343 households; there were 14,848 inhabitants in 2,963 households at the following census of 2011; and in the most recent census of 2016, the population of the rural district was 9,211 in 2,085 households. The largest of its 30 villages was Shahrak-e Mamur, with 2,861 people.

References 

Lordegan County

Rural Districts of Chaharmahal and Bakhtiari Province

Populated places in Chaharmahal and Bakhtiari Province

Populated places in Lordegan County